Gadola is a Swiss surname. Notable people with this surname include:

 Paul V. Gadola (1929–2014), American judge
 Renzo Gadola, Swiss banker involved in the UBS tax evasion controversies
 Robin Gadola (born 1994), Swiss squash player